KBB may refer to:

 KBB, one of the two companies that merged into the Dutch retail group Maxeda
 KBB Records, an English record label founded by musician Ben Bruce and talent manager Kyle Borman
 Kelley Blue Book, a US automotive valuation and research company
 Komoditná burza Bratislava, the commodity exchange in Bratislava, Slovakia
 KBB, Japanese progressive rock group, founded in 1992